Daria Kasatkina was the defending champion, but lost in the first round to Dayana Yastremska.

Belinda Bencic won the title, defeating Anastasia Pavlyuchenkova in the final, 3–6, 6–1, 6–1. By defeating Kristina Mladenovic in the semifinals, Bencic qualified and earned the final berth for the 2019 WTA Finals, overtaking both Kiki Bertens and Serena Williams in the WTA race.

Seeds
The top four seeds received a bye into the second round.

Draw

Finals

Top half

Bottom half

Qualifying

Seeds

Qualifiers

Draw

First qualifier

Second qualifier

Third qualifier

Fourth qualifier

References

External links
 Main Draw
 Qualifying Draw

Kremlin Cup - Singles
2019 Women's Singles